The Polish Journal of Philosophy is a peer-reviewed academic journal that publishes original articles, reviews, and other items to promote continuing philosophical scholarship in Poland. It is published in English. Notable contributors include Peter Baumann, Arkadiusz Chrudzimski, Susan Haack, Dale Jacquette, Stephen Palmquist, Roberto Poli, Władysław Stróżewski, and Jan Woleński. The scope of the journal includes both the phenomenological school of Roman Ingarden and the Lvov-Warsaw school of analytic philosophy. The Polish Journal of Philosophy is edited and published at the Institute of Philosophy, Jagiellonian University in Kraków, Poland. All issues are available online from the Philosophy Documentation Center.

See also 
 List of philosophy journals

References

External links
 

Biannual journals
English-language journals
Philosophy journals
Publications established in 2007
Jagiellonian University
Philosophy Documentation Center academic journals
Academic journals published in Poland